Reinstorfer See is a lake in the Nordwestmecklenburg district in Mecklenburg-Vorpommern, Germany. It has an elevation of 46.9 metres and a surface area of 0.074 km².  It is located northeast of the eponymous village Reinstorf not far from the main road 192 in the midst of a bog and reed area. The lake has a north-south extension of about 430 meters and a west-east extension of about 220 meters. The marshy bank is completely wooded and drained. As a result, the water level dropped to the current level. The surrounding heights reach southeast of the lake over sixty meters NHN .

Lakes of Mecklenburg-Western Pomerania